Football Club de Lézignan (often referred to as the Lézignan Sangliers) are a semi-professional rugby league football club based in Lézignan-Corbières in the départment of Aude in the south of France. They play in the Elite One Championship. They have won seven French Championship titles and six Lord Derby Cups.

The club was founded in 1903. In 1939 the club switched codes and began playing rugby league, which had gained success with the formation of the French championship in 1934. In the 2007-08 season the club, led by their French international player-coach James Wynne, won the French Championship for the first time in 30 years and reached the fourth round of the Challenge Cup. They currently play in the Elite One Championship at the Stade du Moulin and are coached by Aurelien Cologni

History 
In 1893 Joseph Anglade a university professor practised a game called football with students on a ground they called 'Belle Isle'. The game was a mixture of football and rugby, very similar to what is now 'Australian Football' On the back of this a student called Lucien Mountain in 1903 founded the original rugby club 'Football Club Lezignanais'. In 1919 after 14 years playing in the hospital grounds the club moved their own ground to the Stade du Moulin then called the Stadium of the Mill. In 1921 the club competed in the French Rugby Union Championship for the first time and in 1929 they reached the final but were beaten by US Quillan. Disheartened by rugby in France at this time the club was dissolved in 1931 after they had been threatened with a ban from entering the competition due to financial payments.

On 2 August 1939 the new 'Lezignan' club joined Rugby league and participated in the 1939/40 season, unfortunately this would be the last one before war broke out. During the war the Vichy Government banned the sport and made players play union, after the war the club resumed playing Rugby League. The revival of the club began in 1954 with the appointment of Edouard Ponsinet as captain-coach and of the arrival of new president Me Fau. They won their first junior title, then in 1960 the club won their first major trophy winning the Lord Derby Cup under André Carrère. The following season the Sangliers lifted the French Rugby League Championship for the first time beating Roanne XIII in the final. In 1963 they won their second title, with the juniors doing even better as they completed a league and cup double. Two more cup wins followed for the first team in 1966 and 1970.

During the 70s the club under Michel Maïque produced a host of excellent young and local players culminating in a 1978 title win over XIII Catalan in which 12 of the starting lie up were from their own youth team. There were also near misses as they were runners up three times in the cup 1971, 74 and 78 and in the league in 76. It was during this era that one of their best players emerged in Pierre Lacaze nicknamed 'The Butterfly'. There then followed a very long barren spell in terms of success, 30 years, until they won the league title in 2008. There then followed a spell of dominance from the club in which they won 4 straight titles and two cup wins resulting in two consecutive double campaigns in 2010 and 2011. In 2015 they won the Lord Derby Cup for a sixth time beating St Esteve XIII Catalan in the final. Season 2016/17 brought delight in finishing top of the table but disappointment in losing both the league play-off final against Limoux Grizzlies and the Lord Derby Cup final against AS Carcassonne.

Colours and badge

'Lezignan play in white green and pink of various design. The badge depicts a windmill that is still present at the site.

Stadium 

The earliest reference to rugby being played in Lezignan came in 1893 when students played at a place called 'Belle Isle' on the 'Route de Cruscades. Between 1905 and 1919 rugby was played in the grounds of the hospital at the front of the building named as 'Jardins de Blasco' it had one wooden stand, that was stripped away during the war. In 1919 Lezignan president Gustave Gayraud acquired land from the County of Kerouartz to use as a rugby ground. On the land was a vineyard, two mills, one water the other wind, and a small stream, the windmill is now just ruins but the watermill still stands. The first match played at the Stade du Moulin was in October 1919 v Stade Toulousain, the supporters themselves built the first dressing rooms. Over the years work has been done to the ground with a major overhaul done in 2000 following devastating floods the year before. The current capacity is 6,000. On 3 July 2001 the ground hosted its first full international when Scotland national rugby league team won against France national rugby league team 42-20

Current squad
Squad for 2022-23 Season

Honours 
 Elite One Championship (7)
  1960/61, 1962/63, 1977/78, 2007/08, 2008/09, 2009/10, 2010/11
 Lord Derby Cup (6)
  1960, 1966, 1970, 2010, 2011, 2015

References

External links
Official site

French rugby league teams
Sport in Aude
1903 establishments in France
Rugby clubs established in 1903